Loricera is a genus of ground beetles in the family Carabidae, the sole genus of the subfamily Loricerinae. There are about 17 described species in Loricera.

Species
These 17 species belong to the genus Loricera:

 Loricera aptena Ball & Erwin, 1969  (Mexico)
 Loricera balli Sciaky & Facchini, 1999  (China)
 Loricera barbarae Sciaky & Facchini, 1999  (China)
 Loricera decempunctata Eschscholtz, 1833  (North America)
 Loricera foveata LeConte, 1851  (North America)
 Loricera kryzhanovskiji Sciaky & Facchini, 1999  (China)
 Loricera mirabilis Jedlicka, 1932  (China)
 Loricera obsoleta Semenov, 1889  (China)
 Loricera ovipennis Semenov, 1889  (China)
 Loricera pilicornis (Fabricius, 1775)  (Palearctic)
 Loricera rotundicollis Chaudoir, 1863  (Guatemala and Mexico)
 Loricera stevensi Andrewes, 1920  (India and Nepal)
 Loricera wollastonii Javet, 1852  (Madeira and Europe)
 † Loricera electrica Klausnitzer, 2003
 † Loricera exita Scudder, 1900
 † Loricera glacialis Scudder, 1877
 † Loricera groehni Cai; Liu & Huang, 2017

References

External links

 Loricera pilicornis at Fauna Europaea
 
 

 
Carabidae genera